The Käthe Kollwitz Prize is a German art award named after artist Käthe Kollwitz.

Established in 1960 by the then-Academy of Arts of the German Democratic Republic (nowadays the Academy of Arts, Berlin), the prize is awarded annually by a jury whose members are newly chosen each year to a visual artist living and working in Germany who is honored either for a single work or their complete body of work. Since 1992, the prize money (12,000 euros as of 2009) has been co-funded by the Kreissparkasse Cologne, the owner of the Käthe Kollwitz Museum in Cologne. The Academy organises a parallel exhibition, accompanied by a catalog, for the laureate.

Previous winners

1960: 
1961: Arno Mohr
1962: 
1964: 
1965: 
1966: 
1967: Otto Nagel
1968: Willi Sitte
1969: 
1970: 
1971: Curt Querner
1972: Herbert Sandberg
1973: 
1974: Wieland Förster
1975: Werner Stötzer
1976: Harald Metzkes
1977: 
1978: Dieter Goltzsche
1979: 
1980: Werner Tübke
1981: Elizabeth Shaw
1982: 
1983: Sabina Grzimek
1984: 
1985: 
1986: 
1987: Max Uhlig
1988: Christa Sammler
1989: 
1990: 
1991: 
1992: 
1993: 
1994: Karla Woisnitza
1995: Micha Ullman
1996: Martin Kippenberger
1997: Astrid Klein
1998: Miriam Cahn
1999: Mark Lammert
2000: Svetlana Kopystiansky
2001: 
2002: 
2003: 
2004: Peter Weibel
2005: 
2006: Thomas Eller
2007: Hede Bühl
2008: 
2009: Ulrike Grossarth
2010: Mona Hatoum
2011: Janet Cardiff, George Bures Miller
2012: Douglas Gordon
2013: 
2014: Corinne Wasmuht
2015: Bernard Frize
2016: 
2017: Katharina Sieverding
2018: Adrian Piper
2019: Hito Steyerl
2020: 
2021: Maria Eichhorn
2022: Nan Goldin.

See also

 List of European art awards

References

External links
  

German art awards
Awards established in 1960
Käthe Kollwitz
East German awards